Ascalenia bifasciella is a moth in the family Cosmopterigidae. It is found in North Africa.

Adults have been recorded on wing from April to June.

References

Moths described in 1915
bifasciella
Moths of Africa